Ghulam Ali Ansari (born September 8, 1966 in Karachi, Sindh) is a former Pakistani cricketer who played three ODIs between 1993 and 1995.

References 

1966 births
Living people
Pakistan One Day International cricketers
Pakistani cricketers
Karachi Whites cricketers
Karachi cricketers
Pakistan University Grants Commission cricketers
Pakistan Automobiles Corporation cricketers
United Bank Limited cricketers
Karachi Blues cricketers
Pakistan International Airlines cricketers
Karachi Urban cricketers
Cricketers from Karachi